Fanatik is a Turkish daily-published and online sports newspaper.

History 
Fanatik was founded on 20 November 1995. Fanatik is owned by Demirören Group since April 2018, following a group of companies acquisition of previous owners Doğan Holding.
Since 1995, the paper has also been distributed in Germany and Austria, but the distribution was canceled in Germany in 2010. In Germany, the circulation dropped under 8,000 copies per edition. Fanatik also offers web TV.
In 1996, Fanatik held a daily average circulation of 270,517 copies.
Since 2000, Fanatik is a member of the European Sports Magazines.

References

External links 

1995 establishments in Turkey
Bağcılar
Daily newspapers published in Turkey
Newspapers established in 1995
Newspapers published in Istanbul
Sports newspapers
Sports mass media in Turkey
Turkish-language newspapers